Cabaret Balkan is a 1998 Serbian film directed by Goran Paskaljević starring Miki Manojlović and Nebojša Glogovac. Its original Serbian language title is Буре барута (Bure baruta) which means Powder Keg. It was released in English speaking countries under the title of Cabaret Balkan, with the official reason for the name change being that Kevin Costner had already registered a film project under the title Powder Keg. The film received a number of distinctions, including a FIPRESCI award at the Venice Film Festival in 1998. It was based on a play by the same title by Dejan Dukovski. The film was selected as the Serbian entry for the Best Foreign Language Film at the 71st Academy Awards, but was not accepted as a nominee.

Cast 
 Nebojša Glogovac – The Chain-Smoking Taxi Driver
 Sergej Trifunović – The Young Man Who Takes the Bus Hostage
 Aleksandar Berček – Dimitrije, the Crippled Ex-Cop from the Local Cafe
 Miki Manojlović – Mane, the Homecoming Man
 Mirjana Karanović – Natalija, Mane's Ex-Fiancee
 Dragan Jovanović – Kosta, the Man with the Oar, Natalia's New Boyfriend
 Vojislav Brajović – Topuz Topi, the Ex-Student Revolutionary Trafficker
 Nebojša Milovanović – The Bosnian Serb Son Who Doesn't Want to End Up Like His Father
 Lazar Ristovski – The Boxer Who Takes the Train
 Dragan Nikolić – John's Boxer Friend
 Bogdan Diklić – Jovan, the VW Driver
 Toni Mihajlovski – George, the Eternal Culprit, Ana's Boyfriend
 Mirjana Joković – Ana, the 'Flirt' on the Bus, George's Girlfriend
 Ivan Bekjarev – The Man on the Bus Who Thinks He's Tough
 Mira Banjac – The Bosnian Serb Mother
 Marko Urošević – Aleksandar Viktorović, the young Yugo driver
 Danilo Stojković – Mr. Viktorović, Aleksandar's Father
 Milena Dravić – The Lady on the Bus with the Hat and Fox Stole
 Nikola Ristanovski – Boris, the Esoteric Cabaret Artist

See also
 List of submissions to the 71st Academy Awards for Best Foreign Language Film
 List of Serbian submissions for the Academy Award for Best Foreign Language Film

References

External links

1998 films
European Film Awards winners (films)
Yugoslav films based on plays
Serbian-language films
Films directed by Goran Paskaljević
Serbian drama films
1998 drama films
Films set in Belgrade
Yugoslav drama films
Films shot in Belgrade